Huliq (also Romanized as Hūlīq) is a village in Howmeh Rural District, in the Central District of Sarab County, East Azerbaijan Province, Iran. At the 2006 census, its population was 276, in 67 families.

References 

Populated places in Sarab County